The 2016 Wales Rally (formally the 72. Dayinsure Wales Rally GB) was the twelfth round of the 2016 World Rally Championship. The race was held over four days between 27 October and 30 October 2016, and was based in Deeside, United Kingdom. Volkswagen's Sébastien Ogier won the race, his 38th win in the World Rally Championship.

Entry list

Overall standings

Special stages

Power Stage
The "Power stage" was a  stage at the end of the rally.

References

Wales
Rally GB
Wales Rally
Wales Rally GB